Billbergia robert-readii is a species of flowering plant in the genus Billbergia. This species is native to Bolivia and Peru.

References

robert-readii
Flora of Bolivia
Flora of Peru
Plants described in 1987